Stef Dusseldorp (born 27 September 1989 in Winterswijk, Gelderland) is a Dutch racing driver.

He started a career in formula cars in 2007, having competed in series such as Formula Renault 2.0 Northern European Cup (5th in 2008) and the German Formula Three Championship (2nd in 2009, 4th in 2010).

Dusseldorp switched to the FIA GT1 World Championship for 2011, where he finished 7th driving an Aston Martin DBR9 for Hexis Racing together with Clivio Piccione, collecting a win and four podiums. In 2012, he and Frédéric Makowiecki collected five wins and resulted vice-champion, now driving a McLaren MP4-12C. The driver switched to the Blancpain Endurance Series for 2013, continuing as a Hexis driver.

Complete GT1 World Championship results

* Season still in progress.

References

External links
 
 

1989 births
Living people
People from Winterswijk
Sportspeople from Gelderland
Dutch racing drivers
Formula Renault 2.0 NEC drivers
Italian Formula Renault 2.0 drivers
German Formula Three Championship drivers
FIA GT1 World Championship drivers
Blancpain Endurance Series drivers
24 Hours of Spa drivers
BMW M drivers
Van Amersfoort Racing drivers
Rowe Racing drivers
Schnitzer Motorsport drivers
Charouz Racing System drivers
Nürburgring 24 Hours drivers